Cam is a large village and civil parish in Gloucestershire, England, situated on the edge of the Cotswolds and contiguous with the town of Dursley,  north of Bristol and south of Gloucester. The Cotswold Way runs less than a mile from the village.

Cam had 8,160 residents with 3,575 households in the 2011 census. Its population is actually larger than neighbouring Dursley, which is a town.

Facilities

The village has an identifiable centre, with several shops including a pharmacy, a florist, a hardware store and funeral directors, three takeaways, a restaurant, a beauty salon, a combined Post Office and card shop, parish council offices, two pubs including the Berkeley Arms and The Railway Inn and a Tesco supermarket clustered loosely around St Bartholemew's Church. South of the village centre sits the medieval Grade 1 listed Parish Church of St George opposite the Cam Congregational Church. There are more businesses, including a national award-winning butchers in Woodfields and small industrial estate to the west of the village centre close to Shell garage. There is a delightfully named Nikki's Doorstep Sandwich Bar and a printing shop.

Cam supports three state sector primary schools located in the Woodfields, Hopton and Everlands districts of the village. The nearest mainstream secondary school is Rednock, just across the parish boundary in Dursley. A community hub called GL11 is named after the post code.

Leisure

Cam Bulldogs FC is Cam's football team and plays in the Gloucestershire Northern Senior League Division One. The cricket team is called Cam Cricket Club.  Both play at Cam Sports Club, Everlands, which was established In 1923 by the owner of Cam Mills and now run and managed by Cam Sports Club, a registered charity.

There are three public play areas; Woodfield, Cam Green and Jubilee Fields with well maintained play equipment, including swings, carousels, seesaw, spring rockers, skateboard park, gyro spiral, climbers, climbing wall, slides, fitness equipment, basketball courts and football fields. Some of the facilities are on all weather surfaces. Disabled access and some equipment for disabled use.

There is a swimming pool, indoor gyms, running clubs, and cycle clubs in nearby Dursley.

Future development
The council's development strategy for the period to 2031 is contained in the 2015 Stroud District Local Plan.  This designates a 29.1 hectare site on the North-East edge of the village for a strategic development, to feature:
 450 new dwellings (including 135 affordable dwellings).
 11.4 hectares of new B1, B2 and B8 employment land, forecast to attract up to 1500 new jobs.
 A new landscaped linear park extending along the riverside
 A new lit cycle and footpath running through the site to link the village to Cam and Dursley railway station

Employment

One of the main employers in Cam is Cam Mills, which has just under 100 employees. It is the only remaining woollen mill in an area that had many and has been manufacturing cloth, now mainly for tennis balls, for over 200 years.

Notable residents

The artist Alan Lowndes lived in Upper Cam from 1970 until his death in 1978.

See also
Cam and Dursley railway station

References

External links

Cam Parish Council
 Stroud Voices (Cam area filter) - oral history site

Villages in Gloucestershire
Stroud District
Civil parishes in Gloucestershire